Desulfovibrio is a genus of Gram-negative sulfate-reducing bacteria. Desulfovibrio species are commonly found in aquatic environments with high levels of organic material, as well as in water-logged soils, and form major community members of extreme oligotrophic habitats such as deep granitic fractured rock  aquifers.

Like other sulfate-reducing bacteria, Desulfovibrio was long considered to be obligately anaerobic. This is not strictly correct: while growth may be limited, these bacteria can survive in O2-rich environments. These types of bacteria are known as aerotolerant.

Some Desulfovibrio species have in recent years been shown to have bioremediation potential for toxic radionuclides such as uranium by a reductive bioaccumulation process.

Phylogeny
The currently accepted taxonomy is based on the List of Prokaryotic names with Standing in Nomenclature (LPSN) and National Center for Biotechnology Information (NCBI)

Unassigned species:
 "D. caledoniensis" Tardy-Jacquenod et al. 1996
 "D. cavernae" Sass & Cypionka 2004
 "D. diazotrophica" Sayavedra et al. 2021
 "D. halohydrocarbonoclasticus" Zobell 1947
 "D. hontreensis" Tarasov et al. 2015
 "D. lacusfryxellense" Sattley & Madigan 2010
 "D. multispirans" Czechowski et al. 1984
 "D. oliviopondense" Qatabi Sr. 2007
 "D. oryzae" Ouattara et al. 2000b
 "D. rubentschikii" (Baars 1930) ZoBell 1948
 "D. singaporenus" Sheng et al. 2007

See also
 List of bacterial orders
 List of bacteria genera

References

External links

 

}
Desulfovibrio
Bacteria genera